Vadym Deonas formerly known as Vadym Vinokurov (born 25 July 1975, Ukrainian SSR, Soviet Union) is a former professional Ukrainian football goalkeeper.

References

External links
 
 
 

1975 births
Living people
Footballers from Odesa
Ukrainian footballers
Association football goalkeepers
Ukrainian expatriate footballers
Expatriate footballers in Russia
Expatriate footballers in Kazakhstan
Expatriate footballers in Belarus
Ukrainian expatriate sportspeople in Russia
Ukrainian expatriate sportspeople in Kazakhstan
Ukrainian expatriate sportspeople in Belarus
Ukrainian Premier League players
FC Chornomorets-2 Odesa players
FC Chornomorets Odesa players
FC Spartak Ivano-Frankivsk players
MFC Mykolaiv players
FC CSKA Kyiv players
FC Arsenal Tula players
FC Kristall Smolensk players
FC Metallurg Lipetsk players
FC Moscow players
FC Atyrau players
FC Stal Kamianske players
FC Borysfen Boryspil players
SC Tavriya Simferopol players
FC Arsenal Kyiv players
FC Mariupol players
FC Dynamo Brest players
FC Oleksandriya players